Longcross Film Studios is a film and television production facility in Longcross, Surrey, approximately  west of central London. Built on the site of the Military Vehicles and Engineering Establishment, the studio began operations in 2006.

In 2021, Netflix signed a long-term lease deal with Aviva Investors to expand operations and invest in Longcross Studios.

Background 
The studios are built on the site of a 150-year-old manor house in Chobham Common. From 1942 to 2005 the site was used by Military Vehicles and Engineering Establishment for the production and testing of military vehicles and innovations such as Chobham Armour.

In 2005, the site was purchased by construction company Crest Nicholson and asset management company Aviva Investors. Longcross Studios began operations the following year and has since hosted a wide range of film and TV productions, including James Bond's Skyfall, ITV's Broadchurch, and Marvel's Doctor Strange in The Multiverse of Madness.

The rise of streaming services such as Disney+, Netflix, and Amazon Prime and the increased demand for original content has led to a spike in demand for production real estate and sound stages. In order to respond to the demand, Longcross Studios has built a new type of sound stages with Serious Stages, a concert stage and temporary building construction company. The "meganova" stages are built to purpose and can be built in three months versus 12–18 months of traditional sound stages. A number of productions are already taking advantage of the new stages, including the upcoming Mission Impossible films.

In 2021, Netflix and Aviva Investors signed a deal to expand operations and invest in stages and facilities at Longcross Studios. Aviva Investors also acquired the remaining £45 million ($61.5m) stake from Crest Nicholson.

List Longcross Studios Productions

Film
Clash of the Titans (2010)
Green Zone (2010)
Hugo (2011)
War Horse (2011)
John Carter (2012)
Skyfall (2012)
Wrath of the Titans (2012)
Captain Phillips (2013)
Fast & Furious 6 (2013)
Jack the Giant Slayer (2013)
Rush (2013)
Thor: The Dark World (2013)
World War Z (2013)
Guardians of the Galaxy (2014)
Victor Frankenstein (2015)
Alice Through the Looking Glass (2016)
Assassin's Creed (2016)
Doctor Strange (2016)
Kingsman: The Golden Circle (2017)
Murder on the Orient Express (2017)
Star Wars: The Last Jedi (2017)
Aladdin (2019)
Angel Has Fallen (2019)
The King's Man (2020)
Artemis Fowl (2020)
The Gentlemen (2020)
Death on the Nile (2022)
Doctor Strange in the Multiverse of Madness (2022)
The Marvels (2023)
Mission Impossible – Dead Reckoning Part One (2023)
Mission: Impossible – Dead Reckoning Part Two (2024)

Television
Dead Set (2008)
Call the Midwife (2012–present)
Broadchurch (2015)

References

External links
Official site
Listing in British Film Commission
Yelp review

British film studios
Borough of Runnymede
Television studios in England
Buildings and structures in Surrey
 
2006 establishments in England